Anthony Alexander Norman (born January 27, 1955) is a former American and Canadian football defensive end in the Canadian Football League (CFL) and National Football League (NFL). He played in the CFL for the Winnipeg Blue Bombers and the NFL for the Minnesota Vikings. Norman played college football at Iowa State.

References

1955 births
Living people
Players of American football from Atlanta
American football defensive ends
Canadian football defensive linemen
Iowa State Cyclones football players
Winnipeg Blue Bombers players
Minnesota Vikings players
National Football League replacement players